Garbus is a surname. Notable people with the surname include: 

 Liz Garbus (born  1969/1970), American film director and producer
 Martin Garbus (born 1934), American attorney
 Merrill Garbus (born 1979), American musician

See also